The Art Gallery of Southwestern Manitoba (AGSM) is a contemporary art museum in Brandon, Manitoba.

Founded in 1907 as the Brandon Art Club, the AGSM is the oldest centre for visual art in Manitoba and one of the first in Canada.

As a not-for-profit, registered charitable organization, AGSM receives sustained financial support from the Canada Council for the Arts, Manitoba Arts Council, and the City of Brandon.

History 
The Art Gallery of Southwestern Manitoba was founded as the Brandon Art Club in 1907. The Brandon Art Club provided an array of classes in drawing, painting and art history, and regularly exhibited work by its members. In 1959, a permanent space for studios and exhibitions was established and renamed the Brandon Allied Arts Council.

In 1989, after a lengthy capital campaign, a permanent building to house an art gallery/studio was renovated on Princess Street, and re-christened the Art Gallery of Southwestern Manitoba.

In 2000, the Gallery was moved to the recently vacated Eaton's building attached to the Town Centre Mall. The  space was renovated with municipal, provincial, federal, and private-sector funds to accommodate a  environmentally-controlled exhibition space, a community access gallery, and 6 discipline-specific learning/production studios.

References

External links 
 

Art museums and galleries in Manitoba
Buildings and structures in Brandon, Manitoba
Modernist architecture in Canada
1907 establishments in Manitoba
Art museums established in 1907